Kallada River/Kulathupuzha "Puzha" means River. It's the longest river in Kollam District, Kerala, India.The river originates in Kulathupuzha,a part of Western Ghats and flows west reaching Arabian Sea after travelling a distance of 120km.

River Course
The Kallada river originates from the south eastern part of the Kollam district. The river originates as multiple streams arising from Shendurney wildlife sanctuary. The most prominent among this are Kazhuthuruttiyaaru that arise from Rosemala and Ambanad Hills and flow southward, Kulathupuzha river that flow northward by arising from near Ponmudi hills and windward side of Agasthyamala Biosphere Reserve and west flowing streams that arise from windward side of Courtallam Hills. These major streams that form the river meet at Thenmala Dam.

The river flows through the towns of Kulathupuzha, Thenmala, Ottackal, Ayiranalloor, Edamon, Punalur, Nedumkayam, Kamukumchery and Pathanapuram. It then enters the plains where it flows alongside Pattazhy, Enathu, Mannadi, Kunnathur, Iverkala Puthoor, Pavithreswaram, Munroe Island and West Kallada. The river's estuary is situated near West Kallada where it empties into the Ashthamudi lake through which it flows into the Arabian Sea.
 
At Punalur, a Suspension Bridge (Punalur Suspension Bridge) was constructed in the year 1877 across the river by the Travancore Kingdom in British Style. Kallada Boat Race (Kallada Jalotsavam) is one of the most famous boat races held in the state. The boat race is an annual event which takes place at the 28th day after Onam. It is held on the "Muthira Parambu - Karuvathra Kadavu" in the course of the River. Sasthamcotta Lake is the largest fresh water lake in Kerala and provides drinking water for most regions in the Kollam district. Except for an earthen embankment of 1.5 km length which separates the lake from the paddy fields on its southern side, bordering the alluvial plains of the Kallada River, all other sides of the lake are surrounded steep hills.

Industries along the river
There were many industries flourishing on the banks of Kallada river during the British Period. Punalur Paper Mills, established in 1875, is one such major company. The effluents discharged from the mill into the river were found to alter the physiochemical factors leading to production of plankton in the mid-1900s. The mill was embroiled in a labour dispute, and was closed in 1987. It was reopened in 2015, after legal resolutions.

Sand mining along the banks of the river is a cause of concern, because it makes them more vulnerable to erosion and floods.

Kallada Irrigation Project
Kallada Irrigation project (KIP) is the largest Irrigation project in Kerala. The command area of this project is distributed over Kollam, Pathanamthitta district and Alappuzha districts and covers Punalur, Pathanapuram, Kottarakkara, Kollam, Kunnathur, Karunagappally, Adoor, Mavelikkara and Karthikappally Taluks of Kerala. 

The project was planned to irrigate net cultivable command area of 61630 Ha. During the course of execution few canals including Kayamkulam Branch canal were dropped and now this project is benefitting net cultivable area of only 53514 Ha in 92 villages. Head work was completed during 1986. Now fully operational, right bank main canal partially commissioned during 1986 and left bank main canal during 1992.

The Left Bank Main canal is 56.016 km in length and Right Bank Main canal is 69.752 km in length. The Branch Canal of left bank canal is 61.692 km and that of Right Branch canal is 47.573 km. The canals begins from Ottakkal Lookout near Thenmala.

See also
Ithikkara River
Thenmala
Munroe Island
Punalur
East Kallada

References

External links

Story from The Hindu on sand damage on the Kallada

 
Rivers of Kollam district